Hokko Life is a 2022 video game developed by Wonderscope Games and published by Team17.

Gameplay 
Gameplay is generally compared to that of Animal Crossing. The player is given the ability to customize the look of in game items.

Development 
Work on the game began in 2017 by developer Robert Tatnell / Wonderscope Games. Early versions of the game were compared to Transport Tycoon by the developer, with the game later shifting to resemble a social simulation game like the Animal Crossing series as development progressed. Unity was used as a game engine.

In 2020 it was announced that Team17 would publish the game.

On June 2, 2021, Hokko Life was published as an early access title on Steam. At the start of the early access period Kotaku Australia claimed that the game was too buggy to be playable though by launch PC Gamer only noted graphical issues with the UI. While in early access, a version of the game for Amazon Luna was released on January 6, 2022.

The full version released for Windows, alongside versions for Nintendo Switch, PlayStation 4, Xbox One, and Amazon Luna occurred on September 27, 2022.

Reception 

Hokko Life received "mixed or average" reviews according to Metacritic.

PC Gamer noted that the game could run on lower end hardware, while critiquing graphical quality on lower settings, as well as UI issues in the game.

TouchArcade praised the creativity options, while noting poor performance on Switch hardware.

References

External links 
 Official website

2022 video games
Team17 games
Early access video games
Windows games
Nintendo Switch games
PlayStation 4 games
Xbox One games
Social simulation video games